Henrique Fernando Salas Feo (born December 14, 1960) is a Venezuelan politician, President of the centre-right party Project Venezuela, and the former governor of Carabobo State. He is the son of the former Carabobo Governor and 1998 presidential candidate Henrique Salas Römer. He has run for Governor of Carabobo in five elections (1995–2008), winning four times.

Studies and jobs 
He holds degrees in economy and industrial relations and post-graduate degrees from the Institute of High Studies of Administration (Venezuela) and the Chase Manhattan Bank. He has worked for IBM International in the section of Market and Sellings Management.

Political career 
In the 1993 Venezuelan parliamentary election he ran successfully for the Venezuelan Congress, becoming deputy for his home state.

In the 1995 Venezuelan regional elections he was elected governor of Carabobo and re-elected in 1998. In the 2000 elections, after the approval of the new Constitution of Venezuela, he won a new term. In the 2004 election he lost his re-election bid to chavista candidate Luis Felipe Acosta Carlez.

In the 2008 election he ran again backed by the National Unity, a broad coalition of opposition parties including Project Venezuela. This time against chavista Mario Silva, a former host of the TV channel Venezolana de Televisión. On November 23 he won the election with 49% of the votes and was sworn on December 4.

Between 2002 and 2004 he was Vice-President of the Union of Latin American Parties (UPLA), a regional division of the International Democratic Union (IDU) that groups conservative political parties from Latin America.

In May 2009 Salas Feo was noted for calling for a "piggy bank" of cash saved up during the oil "bonanza era" to be used to make up shortfalls in block grants to regional governments.

References

Living people
1960 births
Governors of Carabobo
People from Carabobo
Project Venezuela politicians